In the Mouth of Madness is a 1994 American supernatural horror film directed and scored by John Carpenter and written by Michael De Luca. It stars Sam Neill, Julie Carmen, Jürgen Prochnow, David Warner and Charlton Heston. Neill stars as John Trent, an insurance investigator who visits a small town while looking into the disappearance of a successful author of horror novels, and begins to question his sanity as the lines between reality and fiction seem to blur. Informally, the film is the third installment in what Carpenter refers to as his "Apocalypse Trilogy", preceded by The Thing (1982) and Prince of Darkness (1987).

In the Mouth of Madness pays tribute to the works of author H. P. Lovecraft in its exploration of insanity, and its title is derived from the Lovecraft novella At the Mountains of Madness. Distributed by New Line Cinema, In the Mouth of Madness received mixed reviews upon release, but has since garnered a cult following.

Plot 

In the midst of an unspecified disaster, Dr. Wrenn visits John Trent, a patient in a psychiatric hospital, and Trent recounts his story:

Trent, a freelance insurance investigator, has lunch with the owner of an insurance company, who asks Trent to work with his largest client investigating a claim by New York-based Arcane Publishing. During their conversation, Trent is attacked by a man with mutated eyes wielding an axe who, after asking him if he reads popular horror novelist Sutter Cane, is shot dead by police. The man was Cane's agent, who went insane and killed his family after reading one of Cane's books.

Trent meets with Arcane director Jackson Harglow, who tasks him with investigating the disappearance of Cane and recovering the manuscript for his final novel. He assigns Cane's editor, Linda Styles, to accompany him. Linda explains that Cane's stories have been known to cause disorientation, memory loss and paranoia in "less stable readers". Trent is skeptical, convinced the disappearance is a publicity stunt. Trent notices red lines on the covers of Cane's books, which, when aligned properly, form the outline of New Hampshire and mark a location alluded to be Hobb's End, the fictional setting for many of Cane's works.

Linda experiences bizarre phenomena during the late-night drive, and they inexplicably arrive at Hobb's End in daylight. Trent and Linda search the small town, encountering people and landmarks described as fictional in Cane's novels. Trent believes it all to be staged, but Linda disagrees. She admits to Trent that Arcane's claim was a stunt to promote Cane's book, but the time distortion and exact replica of Hobb's End were not part of the plan.

Linda enters a church to confront Cane, who exposes her to his final novel, In the Mouth of Madness, which drives her insane; she begins embracing and kissing a mutated Cane. A man who had previously attempted to stop Cane's insidious agenda approaches Trent in a bar and warns him to leave, then commits suicide. Outside, a mob of monstrous-looking townspeople descend upon Trent. Trent drives away, but is repeatedly teleported back to the center of town. After crashing his car, Trent awakens inside the church with Linda, where Cane explains that the public's belief in his stories freed an ancient race of monstrous beings called "The Old Ones" which will reclaim the Earth. Cane reveals that Trent is merely one of his characters, who must follow Cane's plot and return the manuscript of In the Mouth of Madness to Arcane, furthering the end of humanity.

After giving Trent the manuscript, Cane tears a giant photograph of his face open, creating a portal to the dimension of Cane's monstrous masters. Trent sees a long tunnel that Cane said would take him back to his world, and urges Linda to come with him. She tells him she can't, because she has already read the entire book. Trent races down the hall, with Cane's monsters close on his heels. He suddenly finds himself lying on a country road, apparently back in reality. During his return to New York, Trent destroys the manuscript. Back at Arcane, Trent relates his experience to Harglow. Harglow claims ignorance of Linda; Trent was sent alone to find Cane, and the manuscript was delivered months earlier. In the Mouth of Madness has been on sale for weeks, with a film adaptation in post production. Trent then encounters a reader of the newly released novel, who is bleeding from his altered eyes; Trent murders him with an axe. Trent is then arrested for murder and sent to the asylum.

After Trent finishes telling his story, Dr. Wrenn judges it a meaningless hallucination. Trent wakes the following day to find the asylum abandoned, and he departs as a radio announces that the world has been overrun with monstrous creatures, including mutating humans, and that outbreaks of suicide and mass murder are commonplace. Trent then goes to see the In the Mouth of Madness film where he discovers that he is the main character. As he watches his previous actions play out on screen - including a scene where he insisted to Linda "This is reality!" - Trent begins laughing hysterically.

Cast 

In addition, Frances Bay plays Mrs. Pickman, while Wilhelm von Homburg appears as Simon. Future Star Wars lead actor Hayden Christensen makes his film debut, briefly seen as a paper boy.

Production 

Michael De Luca wrote the script in the late 1980s and one of the first directors he offered it to was John Carpenter, who initially passed on the project.  New Line Cinema later announced production in 1989 with director Tony Randel to direct.  Later, Mary Lambert was also attached to direct.  Finally, Carpenter signed on as director in December, 1992, and filming took place from August to October, 1993. The film had a budget of approximately $8 million.

The town scenes in Hobb's End were filmed on Main Street Unionville, and the exterior of the Black Church is actually the Cathedral of the Transfiguration. Both are located in Markham, Ontario. The rest of the film was shot on location in Toronto, Ontario due to its unique mix of "New York skyscrapers and New England remoteness" according to Carpenter.

The visual effects for the film were done by Industrial Light & Magic, and the practical effects (including creature prosthetics and animatronics) were done by the KNB EFX Group. It took seven weeks for KNB to create all the practical effects for the film, the biggest of which was an "eighteen-foot Wall of Monsters" that was mounted on rollers and operated by a crew of twenty-five people.

Influences 
In the Mouth of Madness pays tribute to the work of seminal horror writer H. P. Lovecraft, with many references to his stories and themes. Its title is a play on Lovecraft's novella, At the Mountains of Madness, and insanity plays as great a role in the film as it does in Lovecraft's fiction. The opening scene depicts Trent's confinement in an asylum, with the bulk of the story told in flashback, a common technique of Lovecraft. Reference is made to Lovecraftian settings and details (such as a character who shares the name of Lovecraft's Pickman family). Sutter Cane's novels have similar titles to H.P. Lovecraft stories: The Whisperer of the Dark (The Whisperer in Darkness), The Thing in the Basement (The Thing on the Doorstep), Haunter out of Time (The Haunter of the Dark/The Shadow Out of Time), and The Hobbs End Horror (The Dunwich Horror), the latter also referencing Hobbs End underground station from Nigel Kneale's Quatermass and the Pit. 
The Cane novels are, in no particular order: "The Thing in the Basement", "The Breathing Tunnel", "Haunted Out of Time", "The Feeding", "The Whisperer in the Dark", "The Hobb's End Horror", and "In the Mouth of Madness".

The film also can be seen as referencing Stephen King, who, like Lovecraft, writes horror fiction set in New England hamlets. In fact, the characters even directly compare King (unfavorably) to Sutter Cane within the film itself.
Linda Styles tells Trent early in the film, "You can forget about Stephen King, Cane outsells them all!"

The film's main theme, heard during the opening credits, was inspired by the Metallica song "Enter Sandman". Carpenter had originally wanted to use the song, but was unable to secure the rights and instead composed his own theme, with the help of composer Jim Lang and guitarist Dave Davies of The Kinks.

Release

Box office
In the Mouth of Madness premiered at Germany's Fantasy FilmFest on August 10, 1994 and was released in the United States on February 3, 1995. For its worldwide release, the film opened at the #4 spot and grossed $3,441,807 in 1,510 theaters in its first weekend. It fell to #7 in its second week before leaving the top 10 in week three. The film ended up grossing $8,924,549 on a budget ranging from $8 million to $14 million, making it a box-office failure.

Critical reception

The website's critical consensus reads, "If it fails to make the most of its intriguing premise, In the Mouth of Madness remains a decent enough diversion for horror fans and John Carpenter completists." On Metacritic the film has a weighted average score of 53 out of 100 based on 17 critics, indicating "mixed or average reviews".

Critics generally commended the film on its technical aspects, particularly its special effects, acting, and directing, but perceived it as being too complicated, confusing, pretentious, and underwhelming. Roger Ebert gave the film a mixed two-out-of-four stars, complimenting Neill's acting and Carpenter's work as a director, but ultimately said the film fell flat due to its screenplay, saying "...one wonders how In the Mouth of Madness might have turned out if the script had contained even just a little more wit and ambition." Gene Siskel gave the film the same rating, as did James Berardinelli, who said the film "comes close to doing something interesting but gets cold feet" and is "confusing, weird, and not very involving", comparing the film to buying an exotic sports car only to drive it slowly. Entertainment Weekly gave the film a C+ rating. In more negative reviews, Mick LaSalle of the San Francisco Chronicle said the film was "cheesy horror celebrating the power of cheesy horror, while pretending to be appalled," and gave the film a one-out-of-four-star rating. Fred Topel of About.com said the film was "too confusing" and "hard to follow", giving the film a one-out-of-five rating.

In fully positive reviews from the time period, Kevin Thomas of the Los Angeles Times called it "a thinking person's horror picture that dares to be as cerebral as it is visceral" and later named it as one of the top 10 films of 1995. John Hartl of the Seattle Times also gave the film a positive review, saying it's "a stylized collection of well-timed shockers, helped along by the contributions of its capable cast." The Chicago Reader gave it three-out-of-four stars, calling it "a must see". In a later review, Chris Stuckmann also awarded the film with an "A," noting its ambition, creativity, and originality alongside Carpenter's direction.  Reel Film Reviews gave the film a three-out-of-four-star rating.

As with most of Carpenter's work, In the Mouth of Madness has developed a cult following and has gained more positive reviews in the years following its initial release. Stuckmann wrote that he believes the film would've done significantly better if released today, saying "it fits right in with most indie horror films of the last five years" and also noted the film's influence on modern horror.

French magazine Cahiers du Cinéma listed the film as #10 on its 1995 Top 10 List.

Awards

Home media
Following the early VHS releases, a Blu-ray version of the film by New Line Cinema was released in 2013. In 2016, the film was re-released on DVD by Warner Archive Collection. In 2018, Shout! Factory re-released the film under its Scream Factory sub-label as a Collector's Edition Blu-ray.

References

External links 
 
 
 
 In the Mouth of Madness at theofficialjohncarpenter.com

1995 films
1995 horror films
American supernatural horror films
Films about writers
Films directed by John Carpenter
Films set in New Hampshire
Self-reflexive films
Metafictional works
Films shot in Ontario
Films scored by John Carpenter
Films based on speculative fiction works
Films set in psychiatric hospitals
Films set in New York City
Lovecraftian horror
Films set in a movie theatre
1990s English-language films
1990s American films